Roberto Brunamonti (born 14 April 1959 in Spoleto) is a retired Italian professional basketball player and coach. At a height of 191 cm (6'3") tall, he played at the point guard position. He was among the 105 player nominees for the 50 Greatest EuroLeague Contributors list.

Professional career
Brunamonti started his career with AMG Sebastiani Basket Rieti, in 1975, and after seven years, joined Virtus Bologna in 1982. He played with Virtus Bologna, until he ended his career in 1996, after playing 21 years in the Italian basketball league.

He won four Italian League championships (1984, 1993, 1994, 1995), three Italian Cups (1984, 1989, 1990), and one Italian Supercup (1995).

National team career
Brunamonti won the silver medal with the senior Italian national team, at the 1980 Summer Olympic Games in Moscow.

External links 
FIBA Profile
FIBA Europe Profile
Italian League Profile 

1959 births
Living people
AMG Sebastiani Basket players
Basketball players at the 1980 Summer Olympics
Basketball players at the 1984 Summer Olympics
FIBA EuroBasket-winning players
Italian basketball coaches
Italian men's basketball players
1990 FIBA World Championship players
Medalists at the 1980 Summer Olympics
Olympic basketball players of Italy
Olympic medalists in basketball
Olympic silver medalists for Italy
People from Spoleto
Point guards
Sportspeople from the Province of Perugia
Virtus Bologna players
1986 FIBA World Championship players